Gilles Devers, born in 1956, is a French lawyer and academic.

He has represented the Palestinian Authority before the International Court of Justice.

References

20th-century French lawyers
Living people
1956 births
21st-century French lawyers